Libythea celtis, the European beak or nettle-tree butterfly, is a butterfly of the Libytheinae group of the brush-footed butterflies family.

Description

The upperside ground colour is rich silky brown. The forewing has the cell filled with a broad orange-yellow streak which is subapically deeply indented above; a small discal orange-yellow spot present in interspace 1; a much larger, similarly coloured discal spot between veins 2 and 4, on the inner side touching the cell between veins 3 and 4; a subcostal white preapical spot and a quadrate double spot in interspaces 4 and 5, placed obliquely forward to the subcostal spot; this spot whitish above, orange below. Hindwing uniform, with an irregular curved, transverse, upper postdiscal orange patch extending from just below vein 3 to interspace 6, the portion in interspace 6 often detached. Underside ground colour: forewing brown, apex pale purplish irrorated (sprinkled) with minute dark transverse striae and dots, orange markings as on the upperside but paler; hindwing uniform pale purplish irrorated with minute dark dots and transverse striae. Antennae, head, thorax and abdomen dark brown; beneath, palpi, thorax and abdomen concolorous with the tint of the underside of the hindwing.

Range
Its range is southern Europe, Asia Minor, Central Asia and the Chitral ranges of Pakistan.

Biology
The larva feeds on Celtis australis.

References

External links
Sri Lanka Wild Life Information Database

Libythea
Butterflies of Asia
Butterflies of Europe
Butterflies described in 1782
Taxa named by Johann Nepomuk von Laicharting